Sean Ugochukwu "Ugo" Okoli (born February 3, 1993) is an American professional soccer player.

Career

Early career
Born in Federal Way, Washington, Okoli was a part of the Seattle Sounders FC Academy before attending college at Wake Forest University in 2011. While playing for the Demon Deacons Okoli earned All-ACC honors in all three seasons he attended the college and scored 24 goals with 9 assists during his time there. While playing at Wake Forest, Okoli also played in the USL PDL with the Seattle Sounders FC U-23 side in 2012 and 2013. He was also one of the first Academy players to play for the Seattle Sounders reserve side in the MLS Reserve League in 2011.

Professional
In January 2014, Okoli, along with academy teammate Aaron Kovar, signed a professional contract with Seattle Sounders FC. He made his debut for the Sounders on March 8 in the team's Major League Soccer opener against Sporting Kansas City at CenturyLink Field when he came on in the 86th minute for Lamar Neagle. He then contributed to the teams winning goal in the 93rd minute as they beat Sporting KC 1–0.

In January 2015, the Sounders traded Okoli's rights to New England Revolution in order to trade up in the MLS SuperDraft and select Northwestern goal keeper Tyler Miller.

After his release from New England, Okoli signed with United Soccer League side FC Cincinnati for the 2016 season. Okoli led the USL in goals (16) for the 2016 season and was awarded the league's Golden Boot. and Most Valuable Player award.

After spending a season with FC Cincinnati, Okoli moved back to Major League Soccer, signing with New York City FC on December 5, 2016. New York released Okoli at the end of the 2017 season.

Okoli signed with FK Jerv from Norway in August 2018, but left the club again at the end of the year.

In July 2019, Okoli joined Austrian Austrian Regionalliga West side Pinzgau Saalfelden.

Okoli signed with Orange County SC on February 19, 2020.

On February 24, 2021, Okoli joined USL Championship side Austin Bold.

Personal life
Okoli is of Nigerian descent.

Career statistics

Honors

Individual
 USL League MVP: 2016
 USL All-League Team: 2016

References

External links 
 
 

1993 births
Living people
American soccer players
United States men's youth international soccer players
American sportspeople of Nigerian descent
African-American soccer players
Wake Forest Demon Deacons men's soccer players
Seattle Sounders FC U-23 players
Seattle Sounders FC players
Orange County SC players
New England Revolution players
FC Cincinnati (2016–18) players
New York City FC players
Landskrona BoIS players
Association football forwards
Soccer players from Washington (state)
People from Federal Way, Washington
USL League Two players
Major League Soccer players
USL Championship players
Sportspeople from King County, Washington
American expatriate soccer players
Expatriate footballers in Sweden
American expatriate sportspeople in Sweden
Expatriate footballers in Norway
American expatriate sportspeople in Norway
FK Jerv players
Norwegian First Division players
American expatriate sportspeople in Austria
Homegrown Players (MLS)
Austin Bold FC players
21st-century African-American sportspeople